The 1940 Fresno State Bulldogs football team represented Fresno State Normal School—now known as California State University, Fresno—during the 1940 college football season.

Fresno State competed in the California Collegiate Athletic Association (CCAA). The team was led by fifth-year head coach James Bradshaw and played home games at Fresno State College Stadium on the campus of Fresno City College in Fresno, California. They finished the season with a record of nine wins, two losses and one tie (9–2–1, 1–1–1 CCAA). The Bulldogs outscored their opponents 132–52 for the season, including six shutouts and holding the other team to less than 10 points in 10 of 12 games.

At the end of the season, the Bulldogs made a two-game trip to Hawaii, including the January 1, 1941 Pineapple Bowl game against . Fresno State did not give up a point in either of the two games in Hawaii.

Schedule

Team players in the NFL
The following Fresno State Bulldog players were selected in the 1941 NFL Draft.

Notes

References

Fresno State
Fresno State Bulldogs football seasons
Pineapple Bowl champion seasons
Fresno State Bulldogs football